The 1976–77 Guinness National Basketball League season was the fifth season of the National Basketball League.

The league was sponsored by Guinness and the number of teams participating remained at ten. The Embassy All-Stars relocated to Milton Keynes, Cleveland became Durham and Bedford replaced Leeds.

The Crystal Palace team completed a second consecutive double of National League and Cup and were beginning to achieve national public recognition. There were no playoffs for the League during this era and Carl Olsson was awarded the season MVP award.

National League

First Division

Second Division

National Cup Final

Leading scorers

References

See also
Basketball in England
British Basketball League
English Basketball League
List of English National Basketball League seasons

National Basketball League (England) seasons
 
British